Lake Hancock may refer to one of the following:

Lake Hancock (Florida)
Lake Hancock (Washington)